Yekusiel Yehuda Teitelbaum may refer to three Hasidic rabbis:
 Yekusiel Yehuda Teitelbaum (I) of Sighet (1808–1883), known as the Yetev Lev (ייטב לייב)
 Yekusiel Yehuda Teitelbaum (II) (1911–1944), Chief Rabbi of Sighet
 Yekusiel Yehuda Teitelbaum (III), (born 1952) Satmar Rebbe, known in Yiddish as Zalman Leib Teitelbaum